Gullhaug is the name of several places in Norway:

 Gullhaug, Vestfold
 Gullhaug, Akershus

Villages in Vestfold og Telemark
Populated places in Vestfold og Telemark